Khirbat Al-Mansura  was a Palestinian village in the Haifa Subdistrict. It was probably depopulated during an offensive by the Carmeli Brigade at the end of April 1948. It was located 18.5 km southeast of Haifa with a mostly Druze population. Khirbat Al-Mansura contained the ruins of building foundations and rock-cut tombs.

History
In 1863, the Victor Guérin described El Mansoura as a small Druze village.

In the 1931 census of Palestine  it was counted under Daliyat al-Karmel, together with Deir el Muhraqa.

References

Bibliography

External links
Welcome To al-Mansura, Khirbat
Khirbat al-Mansura, Zochrot
Survey of Western Palestine, Map 5: IAA, Wikimedia commons

Arab villages depopulated during the 1948 Arab–Israeli War
District of Haifa